Faku may refer to:

Faku County, in Liaoning, China
King Faku, monarch of the Mpondo kingdom in Southern Africa

See also
 Fakku, an English-language hentai publisher